Jeffrey Thomas Schmidt (born February 21, 1971) is an American former professional baseball pitcher who played for one season. He pitched in nine games for the California Angels of Major League Baseball (MLB) during the 1996 season.

External links

1971 births
Living people
American expatriate baseball players in Canada
Baseball players from Minnesota
Boise Hawks players
California Angels players
Cedar Rapids Kernels players
Lake Elsinore Storm players
Major League Baseball pitchers
Midland Angels players
Minnesota Golden Gophers baseball players
Vancouver Canadians players